Cupramontana is a comune (municipality) in the Province of Ancona in the Italian region Marche, located about  southwest of Ancona.

Cupramontana borders the following municipalities: Apiro, Maiolati Spontini, Mergo, Monte Roberto, Rosora, San Paolo di Jesi, Serra San Quirico, Staffolo. It takes its name from Cupra, a fertility goddess of the pre-Roman population of the Piceni. It had earlier been called Massaccio but later resumed its ancient name.

References

External links

 Official website

Cities and towns in the Marche